This is a list of banks in Nicaragua, including credit unions and other financial services companies that offer banking services and may be popularly referred to as "banks".

History
The two first commercial banks in Nicaragua opened in 1888. The Bank of Nicaragua (Spanish: Banco de Nicaragua), later rebranded as the Bank of Nicaragua Limited, headquartered in London and then merged with the London Limited Bank of Central America, and the Mercantil Agricultural Bank (Spanish: Banco Agrícola Mercantil) that went bankrupt for non-payment of their debtors.  

In 1911, the Government of Nicaragua granted a concession to the investment bank Brown Bros. & Co. from New York in order to establish a banking corporation with shared ownership, both from the Republic of Nicaragua and the North American bankers, which would operate under the laws of the United States of America.

Next year, the National Bank of Nicaragua, Incorporated (Spanish: Banco Nacional de Nicaragua, Incorporado) opened its doors in the capital city of  Managua. In addition to regular banking services, the National Bank of Nicaragua was the only bank authorised to issue banknotes for the Republic of Nicaragua.

List of banks

Central bank

Central Bank of Nicaragua

Government-owned banks

Banco de Fomento a la Producción (Produzcamos)

Commercial banks

BAC Credomatic
Banco de la Producción
Banco Lafise Bancentro
Banco Avanz
Banco de Finanzas (BDF)

Foreign banks

Banco Ficohsa, Honduras
Banco Atlántida, Honduras

Defunct or merged or acquired banks

Banco del Café
Citi, United States of America
Banco Procredit, Germany

Credit Unions and other Financial Institutions
Caja Rural Nacional (CARUNA)
Financiera FAMA

See also 

 Banking in Nicaragua

References
 

 
Banks
Nicaragua
Nicaragua